Romanza final is a 1986 biographic film about opera singer Julián Gayarre. It was directed by José María Forqué.

Cast
José Carreras – Julián Gayarre
Sydne Rome – Alicia
Antonio Ferrandis
Susana Campos
Montserrat Caballé
Aitana Sánchez-Gijón

Awards
This film was nominated for Best Art Direction at the 1st Goya Awards in 1987.

References

External links

Romanza final (Gayarre) on Filmoteca.org

1986 films
Biographical films about singers
Films about opera
Films set in Spain
Films shot in Spain
Films about classical music and musicians
Films set in the 19th century
Cultural depictions of Spanish men
Cultural depictions of classical musicians